Singgasana Brama Kumbara (Throne of Brama Kumbara) is an Indonesian historical-drama television series, produced by  PT. Menaragading Citraperkasa (now Genta Buana Paramita). It is an adaptation of a popular radio series called "Saur Sepuh" with some changes in the plot. It was first aired on ANTV on March 4, 1995.

Plot

Set in 14th-15th century West Java in a fictional kingdom called Madangkara, Singgasana Brama Kumbara tells the story of Brama Kumbara, a young man who becomes freedom fighter after Madangkara was occupied and oppressed by its neighbour, Kuntala Kingdom. Eventually Brama freed his country from the occupation and becomes the King of Madangkara.

Cast 
 Anto Wijaya as Brama Kumbara
 Shahnaz Haque as Harnum
 Murti Sari Dewi as Lasmini
 Fitria Anwar as Dyah Pitaloka and Sri Banon
 Viona Rosalina as Mantili
 Agus Kuncoro as Angkawijaya
 Devi Permatasari as Anggun
 Rizal Muhaimin as Wanapati
 Eddie Riwanto as Ardalepa
 Yati Octavia as Gayatri
 Advent Bangun as Panglima (Commander) Aragani
 B.Z. Kadaryono as Eyang (Grandpa) Astagina
 Piet Ermas as Pangeran (Prince) Gelang Manik
 Bambang Suryo as Prabu (King) Kertawarma and Dang Acharya
 Liza Chaniago as Gendari
 Lamting Saputra as Pangeran Purana and Arya Jimbaran
 Herby Latupeirissa as Prabu Malyapati and Angling Sangabhaya
 Gito Gilas as Pangeran Jayaningrat
 Aldona Toncic as Dewi Nisbi
 Adjie Pangestu as Pranaka
 Piet Pagau as Hadiraksa
 Munie Cader as Durgalapati
 Dian Sitoresmi as Nyai Darsih
 Eddy Chaniago as Darmasalira and Ajisura
 Chairil J. M. as Darmasukarta and Adipati (Duke) Jumawa
 Alvian as King of Kuntala
 Ami Priyono as Tumenggung Jayaraga
 Baron Hermanto as Tumenggung Dharmasandi

References

External links 

 

Indonesian television soap operas
1995 Indonesian television series debuts
1996 Indonesian television series endings
ANTV original programming